Chýstovice is a municipality and village in Pelhřimov District in the Vysočina Region of the Czech Republic. It has about 40 inhabitants.

Administrative parts
The village of Jedlina is an administrative part of Chýstovice.

Gallery

References

Villages in Pelhřimov District